Homies is a South Korean hip hop group composed of Chin, CK, and Louie. They first garnered attention when they appeared on the YouTube hip hop audition program Superbee's Rap Academy in 2019.

They signed to Yng & Rich Records in 2020 where they released the studio album Generation (2021) and extended plays Ghetto Superstars (2020) and Family Business (2021). They won 1 Gaon Chart Music Awards, 1 Melon Music Awards, and 2 Korean Hip-hop Awards.

Career

2019-2020: Ghetto Kids and signing to Yng & Rich Records 
In June 2019, Homies appeared on the YouTube hip hop audition program Superbee's Rap Academy and finished in second place. In November 2019, they released their debut EP B.F.A.M.

In May 2020, they released their debut studio album Ghetto Kids, which was nominated for Underrated Album of the Year at the Korean Hip-hop Awards. In December 2020, they signed to Yng & Rich Records, a hip hop label established by rapper Superbee.

2021-2022: "Siren Remix" 
In February 2021, Homies won New Artist of the Year at the Korean Hip-hop Awards. In March 2021, they released the single "Siren Remix" featuring rappers Uneducated Kid and Paul Blanco. It became their first single to enter the Gaon Digital Chart and peaked at number 18. In December 2021, they released their second studio album Generation and won Best Music Style at the Melon Music Awards.

In January 2022, they won Discovery of the Year at the Gaon Chart Music Awards. In February 2022, they appeared on the YouTube hip hop audition program Drop the Bit as judges.

Discography

Studio albums

Extended plays

Singles

Awards and nominations

Notes

References

External links 

 
 

Musical groups established in 2019
South Korean hip hop groups